Life with Derek is a Canadian television teen situation comedy that aired on Family Channel (English) and VRAK.TV (French) in Canada and on Disney Channel in the United States. The series premiered on Family on September 18, 2005, and ran for four seasons, ending its run on March 25, 2009. Reruns currently air on Family Channel and previously on multiplex sister channel Family Chrgd. The series stars Michael Seater and Ashley Leggat as the two oldest children in a stepfamily.

It ended having aired 70 episodes, and was followed by one spin-off television film, entitled Vacation with Derek, which was filmed in northern Ontario in fall 2009, and it aired on Family Channel on June 25, 2010.

On May 12, 2020, Shaftesbury Films announced that a spinoff television film, titled Life with Luca and set 15 years after the original series, was in development. The spin-off feature film premiered in February 2023.

Plot
George Venturi (John Ralston), a divorced man from London, Ontario who had custody of his three children from a previous marriage: sons Derek (Michael Seater) and Edwin (Daniel Magder), and daughter Marti (Ariel Waller), marries a divorced woman named Nora MacDonald (Joy Tanner), who has two daughters of her own from a previous marriage: Casey (Ashley Leggat) and Lizzie (Jordan Todosey). Up until that point, Casey was perfectly content with her life. Growing up as the oldest child in a household in Toronto with only her mother and sister had suited her well and brought her up as a self-sufficient and independent young woman.

After George and Nora's marriage, the MacDonalds moved in with the Venturis in London, Ontario. Casey was originally upset about having to move to London, Ontario from Toronto, a much bigger city (as shown in the episode "How I Met Your Stepbrother"), for many reasons including Derek, but she eventually got over her own problems and agreed to move there for Nora and George's sake once she saw how much they cared for each other.

Cast and characters

Main

 Ashley Leggat as Cassandra "Casey" MacDonald, the oldest daughter. She is idealistic and independent, as well as academically ambitious. She has a Type A personality, being very particular about her academics and frequently studies in advance and never accepted poor grades. Casey is a Straight A student. She frequently clashes with Derek because of their conflicting personalities, as well as their roles as the oldest children in the household. She loves to dance and compete in jazz dance competitions. She is also a cheerleader at some point in the show. She is also a very talented singer and participates in school musicals. She eventually got into Queen's University along with Derek. In the film Vacation with Derek, it is revealed that Casey will double major in English and Economics.
 Michael Seater as Derek Venturi, the oldest clueless child and the titular "Derek" of the series. Unlike Casey, he is lax-mannered and somewhat underhanded about achieving his goals and excelling in his academics, though is not entirely unkind. Derek is a straight-D student. It is shown that he has a bond with Marti because he calls her "Smarti" and she calls him "Smerek". However, he enjoys annoying and pulling pranks on Casey. Derek is also a huge sports fan and plays on a ice hockey team. Derek has his own band called D-Rock in which he plays guitar. In the final season, he receives admission to Queen's University along with Casey.
 Jordan Todosey as Elizabeth "Lizzie" MacDonald, Casey's tomboyish younger sister and her "sidekick". She usually sides with Casey, though as a middle child, finds common ground with Edwin. She is very patient and gives in to things her sister says very easily. She also likes to do sports such as soccer, gymnastics, and Taekwondo.
 Daniel Magder as Edwin Venturi, Derek's younger brother. He looks up to Derek and is Derek's frequent accomplice in various schemes. He sometimes likes to stand up to Derek but then eventually backs down feeling weak.
 Ariel Waller as Martina "Marti" Venturi, the youngest of the Venturi children. As the youngest child, she enjoys attention from everyone in the family and can be swayed both ways in MacDonald-Venturi conflicts, but can easily and rebelliously not to agree with anyone as well.
 Simon MacDonald-Venturi - Derek, Casey, Lizzie, Edwin, and Marti's half brother and the newest addition to the family. Nora is surprised to discover that she's pregnant with Simon at the end of the series. He had his debut in the film Vacation with Derek. He is only shown in the film, so he did not have a role in the TV series. Simon is the only biological child of Nora and George. 
 Joy Tanner as Nora MacDonald-Venturi, the mother of Casey, Lizzie, and Simon and the stepmother of Derek, Edwin, and Marti. She works as a window treatment specialist and was recently married to a lawyer named Dennis (whom she divorces before the start of the series.)
 John Ralston as George Venturi, the father of Derek, Edwin, Marti, and Simon and the stepfather of Casey and Lizzie. He works as a lawyer and was recently married to a marine biologist named Abby (whom he divorces before the start of the series.)

Recurring
 Shadia Simmons as Emily Davis, Casey's best friend and next door neighbor who had a crush on Derek. She dated Sheldon Shlepper who moved to Newfoundland. She and Derek went on a date once, but decided it wouldn't work out when Derek admits he only asked her out to bother Casey. However, they began to date again after Derek realized he did like her and asks her to the prom. She often tries to help Casey become more popular at school, helps her fit in and helps her figure out boys along the way. According to Casey, she has a "lighthearted way of dealing with Casey's many problems". She started dating Derek in the episode "Surprise", but they broke up, since Derek took interest in Roxy.
 Arnold Pinnock as Paul Greebie, Casey's guidance counselor. She constantly goes to him for advice when she gets stressed; however he usually asks questions so that Casey can figure out her problem on her own. She will ask him questions and then immediately answer them herself. His last appearance is in the episode "Futuritis".
 Kit Weyman as Samuel "Sam" Richards, Derek's best friend and Casey's first crush since she moved in with the Venturis. After receiving Derek's permission, they begin dating in the episode "Male Code Blue". After breaking up numerous times, they call it quits in the episode "Middle Manic", but decide to stay friends in the episode "Battle of the Bands" when Casey becomes the lead singer of Derek's band.
 Lauren Collins as Kendra, popular girl, friend of Casey's and Derek's ex-girlfriend after the episode "Misadventures in Babysitting". She still has a major crush on Derek, and she attempts reuniting with him in "Just Friends".
 Robbie Amell as Max Miller, the school's quarterback and Casey's boyfriend beginning in "Misadventures in Babysitting". He dated the head cheerleader Amy before asking Casey out. They broke up in the episode "Allergy Season". Casey wanted to get back together with him in the episode "Two Kisses, One Party", but he had already moved on.
 Shane Kippel as Ralph Papadapolis, one of Derek's friends and fellow band member. In season 4, Ralph harbors a crush on Casey.
 William Greenblatt as Sheldon Schlepper. He dated Emily. He is currently living in Newfoundland. All of his siblings have been class president except him.
 Kate Todd as Sally, Derek's co-worker who starts to like him after breaking up with ex-boyfriend, Patrick. With some interference and planning from Casey and Nora, they finally begin to date. Sally and Derek break up after Sally decides to go to UBC, get back together soon afterward, and then break up for good when Sally actually goes to Vancouver.
 Joe Dinicol as Truman French, a new boy in school that Casey has recurring dreams about. Casey denies her feelings for him, but in the end, finally agrees to date him. Truman first appeared in "6½". They agree to go with each other in "No More Games" and they start going out in the episode "Teddy's Back". They break up in the episode "Truman's Last Chance" because Casey sees Truman being kissed by Vicki and think it's vice versa. Casey was upset, but she reunites with Truman at the prom, and they reconciled in "Surprise;" however, they broke up.

Guest 
 Sarah Gadon (season 1 episode: "The Wedding"), and later Paula Brancati (season 4 episode: "Truman's Last Chance "), as Victoria, aka. Vicki, Casey and Lizzie's cousin from Toronto. She and Casey appear to be friendly, but things turn tense when Casey and Derek volunteer to organize the wedding reception of Vicki's mother, and Casey later finds out that Derek and Vicki made out when nobody else was aware.
 Alex House as Trevor (season 2 episode: "The Bet"), a "punk" boy who goes to Casey's school. Derek bets Casey she can't get him to ask her out, and Casey takes the bet, soon developing a crush on him. She loses the bet after telling him about it after Derek interferes and makes her feel guilty for lying to him. She finds out Trevor was only hanging out with her because he had a crush on Emily, but the two stay friends.
 Keir Gilchrist as Jamie (season 3 episodes: "It's Our Party" and "When Derek Meets Sally"), Lizzie's best friend who harbors a crush on her.
 Hannah Lochner as Michelle (season 3 episodes: "It's Our Party" and "ower Failure"; and season 4 episode: "Derek's School of Dating"), who first appears at Lizzie and Edwin's birthday party and becomes Edwin's girlfriend after kissing him there. Although she appears infrequently, she is often referenced.
 Adam Butcher as Noel Covington (season 3 episodes: "Show-Off-Tune" and "Allergy Season"; and season 4 episode: "Just Friends"), an "artistic" boy who Casey befriends when he auditions for the lead role in a play on a dare, and, surprisingly, gets it, which leads him to co-star with Casey. He develops a crush on her. In the episode "Just Friends", Casey begins hanging out with him to prove to Derek that a guy and a girl can be friends, but it backfires when Noel thinks Casey asked him out on a date.

Episodes

Production
The first season was filmed on Sound Stages at Atlantic Studios Cooperative Sound Stage in Corner Brook, Newfoundland and Labrador. Seasons two through four were filmed in Toronto, Ontario.

Broadcast

Original broadcast
Life with Derek and another Canadian sitcom, Naturally, Sadie, were both added to Disney Channel in the United States in 2005. In June 2007, Naturally, Sadie was pulled from the channel, but Life with Derek was left on. Though many episodes were originally broadcast on Family in Canada, Disney often advertised the episodes as being new episodes. Life with Derek has not aired on the Disney Channel since January 2, 2010, but reruns continued to air on Family, Family CHRGD until September 2016, and VRAK.TV in Canada.

The first two seasons were added to CBC Gem on December 26, 2019. The remaining episodes were later added on February 14, 2020.

Home media

Awards and nominations
 Directors Guild of Canada
2009 - Television Series - Family (Nominated) 
2007 - Television Series - Family (Nominated)
2006 - Outstanding Television Series - Family (Nominated) 
 Gemini Awards
2009 - Best Children's or Youth Fiction Program or Series (Won)
2009 - Best Performance in a Children's or Youth Program or Series - Michael Seater (Won)
2009 - Best Writing in a Children's or Youth Program or Series - Jeff Biederman for episode "Just Friends" (Nominated) 
2008 - Best Original Music Score for a Program or Series - Gary Koftinoff for episode "Fright Night" (Nominated)
2008 - Best Performance in a Children's or Youth Program or Series - Ashley Leggat
2007 - Most Popular Website
2007 - Best Cross-Platform Project (Nominated)
2006 - Best Original Music Score for a Dramatic Series (Nominated)
2006 - Best Performance in a Children's or Youth Program or Series (Nominated)
 Writers Guild of Canada
2006 - Youth (Won)
 Young Artist Awards
2008 - Best Performance in a TV Series: Supporting Young Actor - Daniel Magder (Nominated)
2007 - Best Performance in a TV Series (Comedy or Drama) - Leading Young Actor - Michael Seater (Nominated)
2007 - Best Performance in a TV Series (Comedy or Drama) - Leading Young Actress - Ashley Leggat (Nominated)
2007 - Best Performance in a TV Series (Comedy or Drama) - Supporting Young Actor - Daniel Magder (Nominated)
2007 - Best Performance in a TV Series (Comedy or Drama) - Young Actress Age Ten or Younger - Ariel Waller (Nominated)
2006 - Best Young Ensemble Performance in a TV Series (Comedy or Drama) - Ashley Leggat, Daniel Magder, Michael Seater, Jordan Todosey, Ariel Waller (Nominated)

Spinoff film
"Life with Luca" is a spinoff movie announced by Canadian media company WildBrain in August 2022. The film is set to follow the return of Casey and Derek, who are all grown up and have teenagers of their own. The movie picks up fifteen years later and follows Derek and Casey as they each navigate parenthood and raise distinctly different teenagers,” the movie’s official logline reads, per The Sun.  The synopsis teased that Casey is now a married lawyer with three kids, while Derek is a successful musician who is also a single dad of one daughter. Actors Jordan Todosey and Danny Magder, who played Casey's sister Lizzie and Derek's brother Edwin, won't be rejoining the cast. According to WildBrain Television, the actors are not reprising their younger sibling roles due to "scheduling challenges, however Todosey claims she wasn't contacted."

References

External links

 

2000s Canadian teen sitcoms
2005 Canadian television series debuts
2009 Canadian television series endings
English-language television shows
Family Channel (Canadian TV network) original programming
Television series about families
Television series about siblings 
Television series about teenagers
Television series by Shaftesbury Films
Television shows set in Ontario
Television shows filmed in Toronto
Canadian Screen Award-winning television shows